Siege of Mecca may refer to:
 the Siege of Mecca (683) by the Umayyads
 the Siege of Mecca (692) by the Umayyads
 the Grand Mosque Seizure by Islamists in 1979
 The Siege of Mecca by Yaroslav Trofimov, a nonfiction book concerning these events

See also 
 Battle of Mecca (disambiguation)